The Portland Linux/Unix Group (PLUG) is a group of Linux and Open Source enthusiasts in Portland, Oregon. The group was started in early 1994 as a venue to discuss and promote Linux and Unix, and is one of the oldest Linux User Groups in existence. PLUG is volunteer-run and does not have any formal criteria for membership.

PLUG's activities include:

 Active mailing list discussions
 A monthly General Meeting on the first Thursday of the month
 A monthly Advanced Topics Meeting on the third Tuesday of the month
 A monthly hands-on Clinic on the third Sunday of the month
 Booth presentations at events around the region

External links
 PLUG's home page
 Calagator: Portland's Tech Calendar

Organizations based in Portland, Oregon
Linux user groups
1994 establishments in Oregon